Howes was a hamlet located on Huntingdon Road between Girton and Cambridge. It was known to have been in existence by 1219 and it began to decline in the mid-fifteenth century with there being no record of it after 1600. The word "howe" means barrow, and the hamlet's name may have been derived from several Romano-British burial mounds in the area, one of which was uncovered during construction of the Huntingdon Road turnpike in 1745.

References

Hamlets in Cambridgeshire
History of Cambridge
Deserted medieval villages in Cambridgeshire